Statistics of Belgian First Division in the 1907–08 season.

Overview

It was contested by 10 teams, and Racing Club de Bruxelles won the championship.
There was no relegation, as the First Division was extended the following season from 10 clubs to 12.

League standings

Results

See also
1907–08 in Belgian football

References

Belgian Pro League seasons
Belgian First Division, 1913-14
1907–08 in Belgian football